EMR; or Universal Camouflage Colourway in English, is a military camouflage pattern in use by the Russian Armed Forces. It is sometimes referred to by the unofficial nicknames RUSPAT, Tsifra and Digital Flora. 

EMR is a single camouflage pattern, developed at 15 Central Research Institute of the Ministry of Defence of the Russian Federation as a universal pattern, depending on the color, it can be adapted to a variety of terrain conditions with good camouflage properties. It’s used as the main pattern of the Ratnik combat system.

The Armed Forces of Belarus uses it as their standard camouflage. However, it's believed that the Belarusian version of the EMR has a slightly different color scheme. 

The EMR has also been adopted by a number of Russian-backed partially-recognised states, militias and paramilitary forces.

History
The camouflage appeared in 2008 after a fundamental decision was made to change Flora. Initially, it was assumed that since "Flora" roughly corresponds to the American Woodland, which in the US Armed Forces was changed to digital camouflages, then the Russian Armed Forces should keep up with this process. 

The creation of the EMR was heavily influenced by the German Flecktarn camouflage, the developers of which managed to "combine the incompatible": small spots that perform an imitation function are combined in this color scheme so that they form groups of large spots that perform a deforming function.

The developers of EMR followed the same path, taking into account the results of studies that showed the effectiveness of extremely small ("pixel") spots as constituent elements of the texture pattern.

It was reported in 2017 that Russian soldiers in the National Guard would discontinue using EMR and instead, use Izlom or Moss-based camouflage patterns instead.

Design
Several variations of this pattern have been produced, the most common of which is the leto (summer) variant incorporating tiny pixels of black, reddish-brown and foliage green on a pale green background. Other versions include sever (northern regions), zima (winter), and gorod (urban). Full-scale adoption began in 2011.

According to TsNIITochMash, the fabric used in EMR is waterproof, flame-proof, tear-resistant and breathable.

It's reported that EMR camouflage fabrics have been made in China due to it being cheap. Depending on the manufacturer, there may be other EMR pattern variants.

Users 

 : Armed Forces of Belarus, with slightly different color scheme. They were first seen with paratroopers from the 38th Airmobile Brigade.
 : EMR clones adopted by Belize Defense Force in October 2011 to replace their non-digital camouflage uniforms.
 : Russian Armed Forces. Replaced Flora pattern.
 : Tajik troops use them.

Partially-recognized states

Gallery

Russia

Belarus

Donbas

References

Bibliography
 

Military equipment of Russia
Military camouflage
Camouflage patterns
Military equipment introduced in the 2000s